Barnes Bridge railway station, in Travelcard Zone 3, is on The Terrace, Barnes in the London Borough of Richmond upon Thames, in south west London. The station and all trains serving it are operated by South Western Railway. It is on the Hounslow Loop Line, 12 km (7 miles) south west of London Waterloo.

It was opened on 12 March 1916 on the Surrey side of the River Thames on the embankment leading to Barnes Railway Bridge, from which it takes its name.

The station, which is not wheelchair-accessible, has an ornate entrance facing the river. Stairs lead up to the two platforms, each with a modest shelter.   The old ticket office is now used as a physiotherapy clinic.

Barnes Bridge railway station is more central to Barnes than Barnes railway station. Passenger numbers are swelled on Boat Race days.

Services 
The typical off-peak service from the station is:
 4 tph (trains per hour) direct to London Waterloo
 2 tph to Weybridge
 2 tph circuitously to London Waterloo by the Hounslow Loop through Brentford and Richmond

Connections
London Buses routes 533(Castlenau-Hammersmith) 378(Mortlake-Putney Bridge) 209(Mortlake-Castlenau), 419(Richmond-Roehampton), and 969(one bus only on a Tuesday and Friday)and night route N22 serve the station.

References

Gallery

Barnes, London
Former London and South Western Railway stations
Railway stations in the London Borough of Richmond upon Thames
Railway stations in Great Britain opened in 1916
Railway stations served by South Western Railway
1916 establishments in England
Buildings and structures on the River Thames
The Terrace, Barnes